Kandry (Qandra) is a rural locality (a selo) in Kandrinsky Selsoviet, Tuymazinsky District, Bashkortostan, Russia. The population was 10,885 as of 2010. There are 76 streets.

Geography 
Kandry is located 40 km southeast of Tuymazy (the district's administrative centre) by road. Starye Kandry is the nearest rural locality.

References 

Rural localities in Tuymazinsky District